The 1994 United States Senate election in Virginia was held November 8, 1994. Incumbent Democratic U.S. Senator Chuck Robb won re-election to a second term versus Republican nominee Oliver North, a Marine Corps veteran famous for his role in the Iran–Contra affair. 

Robb ultimately won by a 45.6% to 42.9% margin, with Marshall Coleman, a former Republican state attorney general of Virginia, taking 11.4% as an independent candidate.

Background and campaign

Campaign
Oliver North was a very controversial figure as he was involved in the Iran-Contra Affair, a scandal during Ronald Reagan's presidency. Marshall Coleman, a former state attorney general, attempted to seize the middle ground between Robb and North. Republican Senator John Warner of Virginia endorsed Marshall Coleman. 

Douglas Wilder, the first black governor of Virginia, who served from 1990 to 1994, originally entered the Senate race as an independent before dropping out.

In his failed bid to unseat Robb, North raised $20.3 million in a single year through nationwide direct mail solicitations, telemarketing, fundraising events, and contributions from major donors. About $16 million of that amount was from direct mail alone. This was the biggest accumulation of direct mail funds for a statewide campaign to that date, and it made North the top direct mail political fundraiser in the country in 1994.

On the eve of the election, former first lady Nancy Reagan told a reporter that North had lied to her husband when discussing Iran-Contra with the former president, effectively eviscerating him. North's candidacy was documented in the 1996 film A Perfect Candidate.

Democratic primary

Candidates
Sylvia Clute
Virgil Goode, State Senator from Rocky Mount
Chuck Robb, incumbent Senator since 1989
Nancy Spannaus, Lyndon LaRouche movement activist

Convention

There was an attempt to draft Governor Doug Wilder to run against Robb, but he chose to run as an independent candidate.

Primary

Republican primary

Candidates
James C. Miller III, former Director of the Office of Management and Budget
Oliver North, Marine Corps veteran

Convention
North won a majority of the vote at the convention. He was not opposed in the primary.

Independents and third parties

Independents
J. Marshall Coleman, former Virginia Attorney General and candidate for Governor in 1989
Douglas Wilder, outgoing Governor of Virginia (withdrew)

Polling

Results

See also 
 1994 United States Senate elections

References 

United States Senate
Virginia
1994